Microryzomys minutus, also known as the montane colilargo or the forest small rice rat, is a species of rodent in the genus Microryzomys of family Cricetidae. It is found in Bolivia, Colombia, Ecuador, Peru, and Venezuela, but these populations may represent more than one species.

Description
The montane colilargo is an ochraceous-tawny colour with very little contrast between the dorsal and ventral surfaces. The upper surfaces of the feet have dark markings, and the hind feet are relatively wide, with large metatarsal pads. The skull is narrower, shorter and less robust than that of the closely related Microryzomys altissimus, and all these characteristics help to distinguish between the two species. The karyotype is characterized as 2n=58.

Distribution and habitat
Its range includes the Caribbean coastal ranges and the Cordillera de Mérida in Venezuela, the Cordillera Occidental, Cordillera Central and Cordillera Oriental in Colombia, and the high Andes of Ecuador, Peru and Bolivia. It inhabits a variety of moist forest habitats including both primary and secondary woodland, rainforests, pine forests, subalpine scrub and the fringes of the páramo. In Venezuela it is believed to be the commonest rodent in the cloud forests.

Ecology
The omnivorous diet of M. minutus includes seeds, fruits, grass stems, insects and insect larvae. Although normally observed on the ground, the longer tail and larger pads on the soles may indicate that it is partially arboreal and it probably climbs more than does M.  altissimus.

References

Microryzomys
Mammals of Colombia
Mammals described in 1860
Páramo fauna
Taxa named by Robert Fisher Tomes
Taxonomy articles created by Polbot